FK Polet is a Serbian football club based in Novi Karlovci, Serbia.

Club has been founded by two brothers which surname is Bajic. Club was founded in 1927. Highest peak was when club was playing in Vojvodjanska Liga. Currently they are playing in MOL Srem East.

References 

Polet Novi Karlovci
Polet Novi Karlovci
1927 establishments in Serbia